The cervical spinal nerve 1 (C1) is a spinal nerve of the cervical segment. C1 carries predominantly motor fibres, but also a small meningeal branch that supplies sensation to parts of the dura around the foramen magnum (via dorsal rami).

It originates from the spinal column from above the cervical vertebra 1 (C1).

The dorsal root and ganglion of the first cervical nerve may be rudimentary or entirely absent. 

Muscles innervated by this nerve are:
 Geniohyoid muscle- through Hypoglossal nerve
 Rectus capitis anterior muscle
 Longus capitis muscle (partly)
 Rectus capitis lateralis muscle
 Splenius cervicis muscle (partly)
 Rectus capitis posterior major muscle
 levator scapulae muscle (partly)
 Thyrohyoid muscle – through hypoglossal nerve
 Omohyoid – through Ansa cervicalis
 Sternohyoid – through Ansa cervicalis

References

Spinal nerves